WHFV is a Catholic Religious formatted broadcast radio station licensed to Shenandoah, Virginia, serving Shenandoah and Elkton in Virginia.  WHFV is owned and operated by Holy Family Communications.

References

External links
 Holy Family Catholic Radio Online
 

2014 establishments in Virginia
Catholic radio stations
Radio stations established in 2014
HFV
Page County, Virginia